Paavo Puurunen (born 28 August 1973 in Kuhmo, Kainuu) is a retired Finnish biathlete who competed at four Winter Olympics. Puurunen debuted on the World Cup scene in the 1995/96 season. His best overall placing is from 1997/98 season when he finished 13th. He won his lone world cup victory in Pokljuka in 2001, in the World Championship, on the 20 km. His second world cup medal bronze in a pursuit is also from world championship that happened in 2003 in Khanty-Mansiysk. At the 2006 Olympics in Turin, he took a fourth place in the mass-start competition his best Olympic result. In an ordinary world cup competition he has no better placing than 6th.

References

External links
 
 

1973 births
Living people
People from Kuhmo
Finnish male biathletes
Olympic biathletes of Finland
Biathletes at the 1998 Winter Olympics
Biathletes at the 2002 Winter Olympics
Biathletes at the 2006 Winter Olympics
Biathletes at the 2010 Winter Olympics
Biathlon World Championships medalists
Sportspeople from Kainuu